Ajith Priyantha Weerakkody (born October 1, 1970, in Colombo) is a former Sri Lankan cricketer who played one ODI in 1994.

External links
 Cricinfo article on Ajith Weerakkody

1970 births
Living people
Sri Lankan cricketers
Sri Lanka One Day International cricketers
Basnahira North cricketers
Nondescripts Cricket Club cricketers